Stanislaus Cauer (18 October 1867, Bad Kreuznach - 8 March 1943, Königsberg) was a German sculptor, medallist and art teacher. He is best known for his monument to Friedrich Schiller.

Life and work

He was the fourth of nine children born to the sculptor, Robert Cauer and his wife Auguste, née Schmidt. His younger brother,  also became a sculptor. 

At the age of fifteen, he began taking lessons from his father at their studio in Rome. He then went on several study trips to France and the Netherlands. After his father's death in 1893, he was persuaded to take over the studio in Bad Kreuznach, but became involved in family squabbles. In 1897, he returned to Rome and married Anna Chidel, the sister of one of his German friends there. 

He was in Berlin by 1905 but, frustrated by the constant struggle to obtain commissions, he accepted an appointment to succeed Friedrich Reusch as a Professor and head of the sculpting classes at the Kunstakademie Königsberg. He was there for over thirty years.

In 1925, he organized an exhibition at the Academy, which included works by Käthe Kollwitz. From 1931, he began making extended stays at the Villa Romana in Florence, where he created portrait busts. He retired from the academy in 1941. For most of his time there, he was a member of the Academy of Arts, Berlin.

He died in 1943 and was buried in the graveyard at the Juditten Church. His grave has not been preserved. 

He created statues in stone and bronze, as well as a number of fountains. In addition to the Schiller monument, his surviving works in Kaliningrad include a marble sculpture, "After the Bath", and three reliefs: two winged female figures and a Hercules. A statue known as "The Apple Thief" was destroyed.

References

Further reading 
 Friedrich Back: "Cauer, Stanislaus". In: Ulrich Thieme (Ed.): Allgemeines Lexikon der Bildenden Künstler von der Antike bis zur Gegenwart, Vol.6: Carlini–Cioci. E. A. Seemann, Leipzig 1912, pg.201 (Online)
 Elke Masa: Stanislaus Cauer 1867–1943. Baltzer, 2000

External links 

 Biography and commentary @ Новые колёса (New Wheels)
 Article on Cauer in the Ostpreussenblatt @ Internet Archive

1867 births
1943 deaths
German sculptors
German medallists
Academic staff of Kunstakademie Königsberg
People from Bad Kreuznach